The Woman at the Crossroads (German: Kreuzigt sie!) is a 1919 German silent film directed by Georg Jacoby and starring Pola Negri, Harry Liedtke and Albert Patry. It is now believed to be a lost film.

The film's sets were designed by the art director Kurt Richter.

Cast
 Pola Negri as Maria 
 Harry Liedtke as Graf Wengerade
 Paul Hansen as Pieter van der Straaten
 Magnus Stifter as Pablo Fuentes
 Albert Patry as Staatsrat Alexander 
 Wilhelm Diegelmann
 Lotte George
 Victor Janson
 Hermann Picha

References

Bibliography
 Mariusz Kotowski. Pola Negri: Hollywood's First Femme Fatale. University Press of Kentucky, 2014.

External links

1919 films
Films of the Weimar Republic
German silent feature films
Films directed by Georg Jacoby
German black-and-white films
UFA GmbH films
1910s German films